The South African type TM tender was a steam locomotive tender from the pre-Union era in the Natal Colony.

The Type TM tender first entered service in 1911, as tenders to a second batch of 25   Mountain type steam locomotives which were ordered by the Natal Government Railways in that year. These locomotives were designated Class 3 on the South African Railways in 1912.

Manufacturer
Type TM tenders were built between 1910 and 1912 by the North British Locomotive Company (NBL).

The Natal Government Railways (NGR) placed its second batch of 25 Class B Mountain type locomotives in service in 1911. The locomotive and tender were designed by NGR Locomotive Superintendent D.A. Hendrie and built by NBL. Known as the Hendrie D, but officially designated Class B on the NGR, it was the first true Mountain type locomotive in the world.

The Type TM first entered service as tenders to these 25 locomotives. More entered service on the South African Railways (SAR) in 1912, as tenders to the ten Class 3B  Mountain type and ten Class MC  Denver type Mallet locomotives, both of which were also built by NBL.

Characteristics

Locomotives
During the classification and renumbering of locomotives onto the SAR roster in 1912, no separate classification and renumbering list was published for tenders, which should also have been renumbered according to the locomotive renumbering list. In most cases, an oval number plate, bearing the engine number and often also the tender type, was attached to the rear end of the tender. Three locomotive classes were delivered new with Type TM tenders, which were numbered or renumbered for their engines in the SAR number ranges as shown.
 1910: NGR Class B 4-8-2 of 1909, SAR Class 3, numbers 1451 to 1475.
 1912: SAR Class 3B, numbers 1479 to 1488.
 1912: SAR Class MC, numbers 1607 to 1616.

Classification letters
Since many tender types are interchangeable between different locomotive classes and types, a tender classification system was adopted by the SAR. The first letter of the tender type indicates the classes of engines to which it could be coupled. The "T_" tenders could be used with the locomotive classes as shown, although engine drawbars had to be replaced to suit the target locomotive in some cases.
 NGR Class B 4-8-0 of 1910, SAR Class 1A.
 NGR Class A 4-6-2 of 1910, SAR Class 2C.
 NGR Class B 4-8-2 of 1909, SAR Class 3.
 SAR Class 3B.
 SAR Class MC.

The second letter indicates the tender's water capacity.

Modifications and rebuilding

Modification to Type XM1
At some stage before 1941, the intermediate draw and buffing gear of two of the tenders, numbers 1607 and 1615 off Class MC Mallet locomotives, were altered to an "X_" tender configuration. These tenders were reclassified to Type XM1.

Rebuilding to Type TL
From c. 1925, several of the Type TM tenders were completely rebuilt by the SAR by mounting a new upper structure on the existing underframe, with  smaller water tanks and a  larger coal capacity. These rebuilt tenders had a more modern appearance, with flush sides all the way to the top of the coal bunker. They were designated Type TL.

The program to rebuild several older tender types with new upper structures was begun by Colonel F.R. Collins DSO, who approved several of the detailed drawings for the work during his term in office as Chief Mechanical Engineer of the SAR from 1922 to 1929. It was continued by his successor, A.G. Watson.

Illustration

References

TM